Toosa is a genus of moths of the family Thyrididae erected by Francis Walker in 1856. The species are found in Africa.

Species
Some species of this genus are:
Toosa batesi Bethune-Baker, 1927
Toosa glaucopiformis Walker, 1856
Toosa longipes (Holland, 1896)

References

External links
Original description of Cicinnoscelis: Journal of the New York Entomological Society.

Thyrididae
Taxa named by Francis Walker (entomologist)
Moth genera